Jira is a proprietary issue tracking product developed by Atlassian that allows bug tracking and agile project management.

Naming 
The product name comes from the second and third syllables of the Japanese word pronounced as Gojira, which is Japanese for Godzilla. The name originated from a nickname Atlassian developers used to refer to Bugzilla, which was previously used internally for bug-tracking.

Description 
According to Atlassian, Jira is used for issue tracking and project management by over 180,000 customers in 190 countries. Some of the organizations that have used Jira at some point in time for bug-tracking and project management include Fedora Commons, Hibernate, and the Apache Software Foundation, which uses both Jira and Bugzilla. Jira includes tools allowing migration from competitor Bugzilla.

Jira is offered in four packages:
 Jira Work Management is intended as generic project management.
 Jira Software includes the base software, including agile project management features (previously a separate product: Jira Agile).
 Jira Service Management  is intended for use by IT operations or business service desks.
Jira Align is intended for strategic product and portfolio management.

Jira is written in Java and uses the Pico inversion of control container, Apache OFBiz entity engine, and WebWork 1 technology stack. For remote procedure calls (RPCs), Jira has REST, SOAP, and XML-RPC interfaces. Jira integrates with source control programs such as Clearcase, Concurrent Versions System (CVS), Git, Mercurial, Perforce, Subversion, and Team Foundation Server. It ships with various translations including English, French, German, Japanese, and Spanish.

Jira implements the Networked Help Desk API for sharing customer support tickets with other issue tracking systems.

License
Jira is a commercial software product that can be licensed for running on-premises or available as a hosted application.

Atlassian provides Jira for free to open source projects meeting certain criteria, and to organizations that are non-academic, non-commercial, non-governmental, non-political, non-profit, and secular. For academic and commercial customers, the full source code is available under a developer source license.

Security
In April 2010, a cross-site scripting vulnerability in Jira led to the compromise of two Apache Software Foundation servers. The Jira password database was also compromised. The database contained unsalted password hashes, which are vulnerable to rainbow attacks, dictionary lookups and cracking tools. Apache advised users to change their passwords. Atlassian themselves were also targeted as part of the same attack and admitted that a legacy database with passwords stored in plain text had been compromised.

Evolution 
When launched in 2002, Jira was purely issue tracking software, targeted at software developers. The app was later adopted by non-IT organizations as a project management tool. The process sped up after the launch of Atlassian Marketplace in 2012, which allowed third-party developers to offer project management plugins for Jira. BigPicture, Scriptrunner, Advanced Roadmaps (formerly Portfolio), Structure, Tempo Planner and ActivityTimeline are major project management plugins for Jira.

See also

 Comparison of issue-tracking systems
 Comparison of project management software
 List of collaborative software

References

External links
 

2002 software
Atlassian products
Bug and issue tracking software
Java (programming language) software
Project management software
Task management software
Collaborative software